= Dick Franson =

1. REDIRECT Draft:Dick Franson
